The Turkey women's national 3x3 team is a national basketball team of Turkey, governed by the Turkish Basketball Federation.

It represents the country in international 3x3 (3 against 3) women's basketball competitions.

Squad
Betül Erkoyuncu
Büşra Akbaş
Derin Yaya
Ezgi Manlacı

Participations

Mediterranean Games

See also
 Men's
 Turkey Men's national basketball team
Turkey Men's national basketball team U20
Turkey Men's national basketball team U18 and U19
Turkey Men's national basketball team U16 and U17
Turkey Men's national 3x3 team
 Women's
Turkey Women's national basketball team
Turkey Women's national basketball team U20
Turkey Women's national basketball team U18 and U19
Turkey Women's national basketball team U16 and U17
Turkey Women's national 3x3 team

References

3x3
Women's national 3x3 basketball teams